Alistair Black was a unionist politician in Northern Ireland.

The headmaster of Carrick Primary School, Black came to prominence as the leading figure in Ulster Vanguard in County Armagh.  Due to his outspoken loyalist views, the Irish Republican Army attempted to kill him in 1972 and again in 1975, when a bomb left in his desk drawer instead killed a police officer who was investigating.

Black was elected to Craigavon Borough Council for the Vanguard Unionist Progressive Party at the 1973 Northern Ireland local elections, and then to the Northern Ireland Constitutional Convention in Armagh in 1975.  He joined the United Ulster Unionist Party (UUUP) split from Vanguard and held his council seat in 1977 and 1981, but lost his Armagh seat at the 1982 Assembly election.  When the UUUP dissolved, he instead joined the Ulster Unionist Party and again held his council seat in 1985.

References

Year of birth missing
Possibly living people
Members of Craigavon Borough Council
Members of the Northern Ireland Constitutional Convention
People from Lurgan
Ulster Unionist Party councillors
United Ulster Unionist Party politicians
Vanguard Unionist Progressive Party politicians